Lindsell is a surname. Notable people with the surname include: 

Augustine Lindsell (died 1634), English classical scholar and Bishop of Hereford
Harold Lindsell (1913–1998), evangelical Christian author and scholar
Stuart Lindsell (1892–1969), British actor
Wilfrid Gordon Lindsell (1884–1973), British Army logistics officer